This is a directory of patriarchs across various Christian denominations.

Lists

 List of current patriarchs
 List of Abunas of Ethiopia
 List of Armenian patriarchs of Constantinople
 List of Armenian Catholic patriarchs of Cilicia
 List of bishops and patriarchs of Aquileia
 List of catholicoi of all Armenians
 List of Catholicoi of the East
 List of Chaldean Catholic patriarchs of Babylon
 List of Coptic Catholic patriarchs of Alexandria
 List of Coptic Orthodox popes of Alexandria
 List of Greek Orthodox patriarchs of Alexandria
 List of Greek Orthodox patriarchs of Antioch
 List of Greek Orthodox patriarchs of Jerusalem
 List of heads of the Serbian Orthodox Church
 List of Latin patriarchs of Jerusalem
 List of metropolitans and patriarchs of Kyiv
 List of Maronite patriarchs of Antioch
 List of Melkite Greek Catholic patriarchs of Antioch
 List of metropolitans and patriarchs of Moscow
 List of patriarchs of Alexandria
 List of patriarchs of Antioch
 List of patriarchs of the Bulgarian Orthodox Church
 List of patriarchs of the Church of the East
 List of ecumenical patriarchs of Constantinople
 List of patriarchs of the Czechoslovak Hussite Church
 List of patriarchs of Eritrea
 List of Roman Catholic popes
 List of supreme governors of the Church of England
 List of Syriac Catholic patriarchs of Antioch
 List of Syriac Orthodox patriarchs of Antioch

See also
Patriarch
Archbishop
Bishop
List of Bishops and Archbishops
diocese
Lists of office-holders